Travis Gawryletz (born November 2, 1985) is a Canadian former professional ice hockey player and current linesman for the National Hockey League.

Playing career
Gawryletz played Junior hockey with the Trail Smoke Eaters of the British Columbia Hockey League and became the first Smoke Eater to be selected straight from the BCHL when he was drafted 253rd overall in the 2004 NHL Entry Draft by the Philadelphia Flyers. He was then recruited to the University of Minnesota-Duluth to play collegiate hockey in the Western Collegiate Hockey Association. Selected for his size by the Flyers, Gawryletz developed into a physical defensive defenceman among the Bulldogs d-corps and in his four-year career with Duluth, Travis appeared in 140 games with only 23 points.

Unsigned from the Flyers after completing his college career Gawryletz signed as a free agent with the Elmira Jackals of the ECHL before attending the AHL's Rochester Americans training camp prior to his first professional season in 2008–09. Gawryletz established himself within the Jackals with gritty defensive play and posted 16 points in 56 games to be named the Jackals top defenceman for the season.

Gawryletz was again invited to the Amerks AHL training camp but re-signed with the Jackals to start the 2009–10 season. Leading the Jackals and placing second in the ECHL in plus/minus after 16 games, he was loaned to make his AHL debut with the Lake Erie Monsters on November 27, 2010. Gawryletz's solid contributions on the blueline meant he remained with the Monsters for the duration of their season, leading all defenceman and placing second on the team with a plus/minus of 11, before returning to Elmira for the ECHL playoffs.

In mid-April, on the back of a successful season, Gawryletz signed a one-year contract to return to the Lake Erie Monsters for the 2010–11 season.

Despite two successful seasons with the Monsters, Gawryletz did not garner NHL interest. He attended the Manchester Monarchs training camp, before signing a one-year contract with ECHL team, the Ontario Reign. After just two games with the Reign, Gawryletz signed in Europe with HC Karlovy Vary of the Czech Extraliga on October 19, 2011.

Unable to help prevent Karlovy Vary stay out of a relegation battle at season's end, Gawryletz impressed and was signed to a one-year contract by powerhouse rivals, HC Sparta Praha on May 2, 2012. In the 2012–13 season, Gawryletz appeared in 19 games with just three assists for Sparta before he was released to join his third Czech club, HC Pardubice, for the remainder of the season on November 28, 2012.

On July 15, 2013, Gawryletz opted to join the Austrian Hockey League and signed a one-year contract with Hungarian participant Alba Volán Székesfehérvár. After 18 games with Alba, Gawryletz opted to terminate his contract and return to North America on November 6, 2013. On January 7, 2014, Gawryletz signed a contract with the Bakersfield Condors of the ECHL but retired soon after.

Officiating career
Following his retirement as a player, Gawryletz worked as a linesman for the Western Hockey League for one season. He officiated his first AHL game in March 2017 and first NHL game the following November. Prior to the start of the 2018-19 NHL season, he was promoted to a full-time spot on the officiating roster.

Personal
Gawryletz currently lives in Kelowna, British Columbia with his wife and son. His older brother, Brandon, is also an NHL official.

Career statistics

References

External links

1985 births
Living people
Fehérvár AV19 players
Bakersfield Condors (1998–2015) players
Canadian ice hockey officials
Elmira Jackals (ECHL) players
HC Karlovy Vary players
HC Dynamo Pardubice players
HC Sparta Praha players
Lake Erie Monsters players
Minnesota Duluth Bulldogs men's ice hockey players
National Hockey League officials
Ontario Reign (ECHL) players
Philadelphia Flyers draft picks
Sportspeople from Trail, British Columbia
Canadian ice hockey defencemen
Ice hockey people from British Columbia
Canadian expatriate ice hockey players in the United States
Canadian expatriate ice hockey players in the Czech Republic
Canadian expatriate ice hockey players in Hungary